General elections were held in Costa Rica on 4 October 1949. They followed the introduction of a new constitution after the Costa Rican Civil War. Voters elected a Vice-President (as none had been chosen in the 1948 elections and the Legislative Assembly. The result was a victory for the National Unity Party, which won 71.7% of the vote. Voter turnout was 43.8% in the vice-presidential election and 49.2% in the parliamentary election.

Results

References

1949 elections in Central America
1949 in Costa Rica
Elections in Costa Rica